Jimmy Hague (born August 28, 1996) is an American soccer player.

Career

College & Amateur 
Hague played college soccer at Michigan State University between 2015 and 2018, becoming starter for the team for 3 seasons and making 63 appearances for the Spartans.

While at college, Hague also played with USL PDL side Michigan Bucks.

Professional 
On January 11, 2019, Hague was selected 30th overall in the 2019 MLS SuperDraft by FC Cincinnati. On February 6, 2019, Hague signed for Cincinnati. He was waived following the 2019 season without making a first team appearance for the club.

On January 28, 2020, Hague signed with USL Championship side Memphis 901.

References

External links 
 Jimmy Hague - Men's Soccer Michigan State bio
 

1996 births
American soccer players
Association football goalkeepers
FC Cincinnati draft picks
FC Cincinnati players
Living people
Memphis 901 FC players
Flint City Bucks players
Michigan State Spartans men's soccer players
People from Walled Lake, Michigan
Soccer players from Michigan
USL Championship players
USL League Two players